Laura Anne Taalman, also known as mathgrrl, is an American mathematician known for her work on the mathematics of Sudoku and for her mathematical 3D printing models. Her mathematical research concerns knot theory and singular algebraic geometry; she is a professor of mathematics at James Madison University.

Life
Taalman earned a bachelor's degree in mathematics from the University of Chicago in 1994. She completed her Ph.D. at Duke University in 2000; her dissertation, Monomial Generators for the Nash Sheaf of a Complete Resolution, was supervised by William L. Pardon. On finishing her doctorate, she joined the James Madison faculty; she has also worked as the mathematician-in-residence at the National Museum of Mathematics in 2014–2015.

3d printing

In 2013–2014, after becoming head of the 3d printing lab at James Madison University, Taalman set out on a project of printing one 3d model per day. Her models have included subjects from mathematics including knots, fractals, and snap-together polyhedra.

Books
With Peter Kohn, Taalman is the author of a textbook Calculus. She is also the author of a different text, Calculus I with Integrated Precalculus.

With Jason Rosenhouse (also a mathematics professor at James Madison University) she is the author of Taking Sudoku Seriously: The Mathematics Behind the World’s Most Popular Pencil Puzzle. She has also written a series of Sudoku puzzle books with Philip Riley.

Awards and honors
Taalman won the Trevor Evans Award of the Mathematical Association of America in 2003 for her work with Eugénie Hunsicker on the mathematics of Modular architecture.

In 2005, Taalman won the Henry L. Alder Award for Distinguished
Teaching by a Beginning College or
University Mathematics Faculty Member, given by the Mathematical Association of America.

Her book Taking Sudoku Seriously was the 2012 winner of the PROSE Awards in the popular science and popular mathematics category.

References

External links

Home page

Year of birth missing (living people)
Living people
American women mathematicians
21st-century American mathematicians
Recreational mathematicians
Mathematics popularizers
University of Chicago alumni
Duke University alumni
James Madison University faculty
21st-century women mathematicians
21st-century American women